Pierce, Butler & Pierce Manufacturing Company (1839-193x) was a manufacturer of "heating and sanitary goods" for the bathroom in Syracuse, New York. The company was founded by Sylvester Phineas Pierce and his son, William Kasson Pierce, was president of the firm from 1893 to 1914.

External links

 William Kasson Pierce, Rootsweb, 2010

References 

Defunct companies based in Syracuse, New York
Defunct companies based in New York (state)
Manufacturing companies established in 1839